La recogida (English title:The collection) is a Mexican telenovela by Televisa produced by Valentín Pimstein and Luis de Llano Palmer and directed by Fernando Wagner for Telesistema Mexicano. Is original story and adaptation by Julio Porter.

María Fernanda Ayensa starred as young protagonist, Silvia Pasquel and Antonio Medellín starred as adult protagonists. Bertha Moss and Jorge Castillo starred as main antagonists. With the special appearance of Silvia Derbez.

Cast 
María Fernanda Ayensa as Alejandra
Sylvia Pasquel as Alicia
Antonio Medellín as Luis Tejeda
Bertha Moss as Matilde
Jorge Castillo 
Ada Carrasco
Enrique Becker
Pituka de Foronda
Pili Gonzalez
Aurora Alcarano
Mario Gozalez
Socorro Avelar
Norma Rodriguez
Silvia Derbez as Nora Medrano

Other version
In 1974 a film version with the same name La recogida.
In 2001 Televisa takes a remake titled María Belén.

References 

Mexican telenovelas
1971 telenovelas
Televisa telenovelas
Spanish-language telenovelas
1971 Mexican television series debuts
1971 Mexican television series endings